Alversund is a former municipality in the old Hordaland county, Norway.  The municipality existed from 1885 until 1964. It was located in the southwestern part of the mainland portion of the present-day Alver Municipality in Vestland county. It originally included area on the island of Holsnøy as well, but that was later separated.  Alversund covered  upon its dissolution in 1964.  The administrative centre of the municipality was the village of Alversund, where Alversund Church is located.

Name
The municipality (originally the parish) is named after the old Alver farm since the first Alversund Church was built there.  The meaning of the farm name is "all weather" (meaning "weather from all directions" - describing a farm with an exposed and unsheltered site).  The last element is sund which means "sound" or "strait", referring to the nearby Alverstraumen strait.

History

The municipality of Alversund was established on 1 January 1885 when the old municipality of Hammer was divided into two separate municipalities.  The northwestern part of the old Hammer municipality became Alversund, and it also included the annex of Seim which had been a part of the municipality of Hosanger before that time.  The initial population of Alversund was 2,793.  On 1 January 1904, a small area near Hanevik on the island of Askøy (population: 32) was transferred from the municipality of Askøy to Alversund.  On 15 October 1923, the western district of Alversund (population: 1716) was separated to form the new municipality of Meland.  This left Alversund with 1,771 residents.  On 1 January 1964, all of Alversund was merged with parts of the municipalities of Modalen, Hosanger, Hamre, Sæbø, and Lindås to form a new, larger municipality of Lindås. At its dissolution, Alversund had 2,099 residents.

Municipal council
The municipal council  of Alversund was made up of 17 representatives that were elected to four year terms.  The party breakdown of the final municipal council was as follows:

See also
List of former municipalities of Norway

References

Alver (municipality)
Former municipalities of Norway
1885 establishments in Norway
1964 disestablishments in Norway